Canneto is an Italian word referred to a reed bed. It may refer to several places in Italy:

Municipalities (comuni)
Canneto Pavese, in the Province of Pavia, Lombardy
Canneto sull'Oglio, in the Province of Mantua, Lombardy

Civil parishes (frazioni)
Canneto (Caronia), in the municipality of Caronia (ME), Sicily, famous for the Canneto fires
Canneto (Lipari), in the municipality of Lipari (ME), Sicily
Canneto (Monteverdi Marittimo), in the municipality of Monteverdi Marittimo (PI), Tuscany
Canneto (Perugia), in the municipality of Perugia, Umbria
Canneto (Postiglione), in the municipality of Postiglione (SA), Campania
Canneto Sabino, in the municipality of Fara in Sabina (RI), Lazio
Ronco Campo Canneto, in the municipality of Trecasali (PR), Emilia-Romagna
Canneto di Bari, former municipality, now one of the quarters constituting Adelfia (BA), Apulia